Gymnadenia odoratissima is a species of orchid.

References 

odoratissima
Plants described in 1759